Bruzelius is a Swedish surname. Notable people with the surname include:

Anders Bruzelius, Swedish jurist
Caroline Bruzelius (born 1949), American art historian
Karin Maria Bruzelius (born 1941), Swedish-born Norwegian supreme court justice and civil servant

Swedish-language surnames